Blue Mind: The Surprising Science That Shows How Being Near, In, On, Or Under Water Can Make You Happier, Healthier, More Connected, and Better at What You Do is a bestselling book by marine biologist Wallace J. Nichols about the effects bodies of water have on human health and well-being.

Contents 
The book covers "therapeutic landscapes" as they are referred to in medical literature, specifically ones that are near, in, or on the water. The book analyzes studies that suggest living or simply being near bodies of water can have powerful psychological and even physiological effects.

Human condition 
Blue Mind considers the impact of water on the human condition. The book considers the impacts of water on mental health. Nichols told Quartz:

Research 
Blue Mind compiles and analyzes recent scientific research that has shown water's favorable cognitive and physical impacts being quantified by experts. The book shows proof that living near the shore, for example, has been shown to boost physical health and well-being. It also provides evidence that water generates a meditative state, which makes us happier, healthier, calmer, and more creative.

Reception 
The book was received well by critics, and made The New York Times Best Seller list. A review from The Guardian labeled Blue Mind "popular psychology", calling it "a study in water and why it makes us happy". A review from the Association for the Sciences of Limnology and Oceanography said "Blue Mind is an interesting read and presents a different perspective on water than we typically think about during the course of our hectic days."

References 

Non-fiction books
Self-help books
Books about science